Retocomus is a genus of antlike flower beetles in the family Anthicidae. There are about 17 described species in Retocomus.

Species
These 17 species belong to the genus Retocomus:

 Retocomus alami Abdullah, 1965
 Retocomus basiri Abdullah, 1965
 Retocomus brittoni Abdullah, 1965
 Retocomus colasi Abdullah, 1965
 Retocomus constrictus (LeConte, 1852)
 Retocomus crichtoni Abdullah, 1965
 Retocomus crowsoni Abdullah, 1965
 Retocomus duboisi Abdullah, 1965
 Retocomus gratus Casey, 1895
 Retocomus kaszabi Abdullah, 1965
 Retocomus lindrothi Abdullah, 1965
 Retocomus mockfordi Abdullah, 1965
 Retocomus murinus (Haldeman, 1843)
 Retocomus qadrii Abdullah, 1965
 Retocomus rehni Abdullah, 1965
 Retocomus riletti Abdullah, 1965
 Retocomus wildii (LeConte, 1855)

References

Further reading

 
 

Anthicidae
Articles created by Qbugbot